Frane Despotović (born 25 April 1982) is a Croatian futsal player who plays for Balzan Futsal and the Croatia national futsal team.

References

External links
UEFA profile

1982 births
Living people
Croatian men's futsal players